WestGate Mall is a shopping mall in Spartanburg, South Carolina, off Interstate 26 and US Highway 29 on West Blackstock Road in the city's primary shopping market.  The regional mall has  of retail space and five anchor stores: Bed Bath & Beyond, Belk, Costco, Dillard's, and JCPenney.

History
Westgate Mall was built by Arlen Realty and Development Corporation, and opened on October 28, 1975. At the time, it was the largest mall in South Carolina. Its original anchor stores were Belk-Hudson, Sears, and Meyers-Arnold. JCPenney was added in 1978. It was sold to JMB Realty in the late 1970s, then to Bramalea Centers in 1988. Meyers-Arnold was bought out by Uptons in 1987, thus canceling the latter chain's plans to build a store at nearby Hillcrest Mall.

After Bramalea filed for bankruptcy in 1992, the mall was purchased by CBL & Associates Properties, a successor of Arlen Realty. CBL expanded the mall, adding a new wing that featured Dillard's and J. B. White, as well as a food court and movie theater owned by Regal Entertainment Group. Storefronts within the mall were also upgraded, and the Belk store was expanded by 30,000 square feet. These expansions made the mall the first in the Carolinas to feature six anchors. J. B. White's store became Proffitt's in 1998.

Uptons, which purchased the Meyers-Arnold chain in 1987, closed in 1999. As it was less than half the size of the other department stores, the mall's then-manager considered converting the building to either a "junior" department store or several stores. Bed Bath & Beyond opened in half of the former Uptons building in December 2000, with Dick's Sporting Goods filling the other half in mid-2001.

Following the purchase of Proffitt's by Belk in 2005, the fate of the Proffitt's store was originally uncertain due to Belk already having a store in the mall. The Proffitt's store was then closed and demolished for a Costco, which opened in 2007.

On May 31, 2018, it was announced that Sears would be closing as part of a plan to close 72 stores nationwide. The store closed on September 2, 2018.

References

External links 
 WestGate Mall Official Website
 WestGate Mall CBL Properties Official leasing website

Buildings and structures in Spartanburg, South Carolina
Shopping malls in South Carolina
CBL Properties
Shopping malls established in 1975
1975 establishments in South Carolina